The men's team classification tennis event at the 2017 Summer Universiade was held on 29 August 2017 at the Taipei Tennis Center in Taipei, Taiwan.

Ranking system
The chart below shows that the points earn on each ranking in each events.

If the results are same, the rank will be judged in the following steps:

Medal counts 
Gold medal counts 
Best rank at the singles event.

Results

Medalists

Points count

References

Men's team classification